Joy Ride is a 1958 American crime film directed by Edward Bernds and written by Christopher Knopf. The film stars Regis Toomey, Ann Doran, James Westmoreland, Nicholas King, James Bridges and Robert Levin. The film was released on November 23, 1958, by Allied Artists Pictures.

Plot

Cast          
Regis Toomey as Miles
Ann Doran as Grace
James Westmoreland as Paul 
Nicholas King as Arnie
James Bridges as Dirk 
Robert Levin as Vince
Roy Engel as Barrett
Robert Colbert as Taverner
Robert Anderson as Ellensten
Chris Alcaide as Stewart
Stacy Keach Sr. as Wechsler

References

External links
 

1958 films
American crime films
1958 crime films
Allied Artists films
Films directed by Edward Bernds
1950s English-language films
1950s American films